Symphonic Distribution is a digital music distribution company launched in late 2006 by Jorge Brea, in Tampa, Florida. Symphonic Distribution delivers music from independent record labels and musicians to online retailers such as Spotify, iTunes, Apple Music, Napster, Deezer, Pandora, Amazon, and Beatport.

History and background
Symphonic Distribution is based in Tampa, Florida and was founded in late 2006. By 2010, Symphonic Distribution was earning more than half a million dollars a year in revenue. It generated $2.3 million in revenue in 2014, about $500,000 of which was profit.

In 2016, Symphonic Distribution announced an expansion into New York with the intention of establishing relationships for its distributed labels, artists, and independent brands. In addition, following the closure of Beatport's Distribution company, Baseware Distribution, Symphonic signed over 200 distribution accounts from the defunct distributor.

In 2017, Symphonic Distribution received a growth capital investment of $4M from Ballast Point Ventures, a Tampa-based private equity firm. After the investment, the company hired former Orchard executives Nick Gordon and Eshan Shah Jahan as Chief Client Officer & GM  and Head of Product based in New York respectively.  

The company continued to hire staff members through 2017 and 2018. In 2018, the company hired Jakub Alexander as Director of A&R & Client Development. Jakub, a veteran of label Ghostly International. In addition, Symphonic built out a Client Marketing team, expanding its marketing in Latin America, Hip Hop, Pop, and more. Jon Mizrachi also joined as Senior Director of Sync Licensing after spending 12 years at Carlin America as Creative Director for synchronization licensing in film, television and advertising.

In April 2018, the company relocated headquarters to downtown Tampa, Florida where it shares an office building with Tampa Theatre. Following the move, the company worked in collaboration with the Tampa Downtown Partnership to create several Spotify playlists, each embodying experiences unique to the Tampa Bay area and featuring local artists. 

Another location opened in 2018 with the opening of the Nashville office of Symphonic, headed by VP, Business Development, Randall Foster who previously worked at Naxos and Anthem Entertainment. Symphonic has continued to launch new locations in Colombia, Brazil, Africa, Mexico, and other countries around the world as well as cities throughout the USA like Los Angeles and Brooklyn, and has continued to launch new solutions in the areas of Catalog Management and Transfer, SplitPay, Analytics, and more. In addition, Symphonic has paid over $100 Million Dollars in artist royalties since its inception.

In January 2022, Symphonic announced a $37 million investment in a Series B round of funding led by NewSpring and Ballast Point Ventures. Later in 2022, Symphonic acquired Streaming Promotions, expanded its presence in Canada, and launched a DIY option called "Symphonic Starter" which lets artists upload unlimited songs for $19.99 a year in exchange for 100% of royalties.

Video Distribution 
In July 2014, Symphonic launched its Video Distribution services. In 2018, Symphonic partnered with Vevo, allowing artists to create and upload music videos on the platform.

Acquisition of Houseplanet Distribution 
In 2017, Houseplanet Distribution was acquired by Symphonic Distribution. Houseplanet Distribution, located in Madrid, Spain, as of 2006, focuses on the distribution of house music.

Sync Licensing 
In February 2019, Symphonic extended its distribution and label services with a sync licensing division. In addition to being a standalone full-service sync licensing agency, Bodega will serve as the sync licensing arm of Symphonic.

Publishing Administration 
In March 2019, Symphonic Distribution announced a partnership with Music Publishing Administration Service.

Partnerships 
In 2021, Symphonic Distribution, UnitedMasters, and Horus Music partnered with the music funding company beatBread to offer clients more access to capital. beatBread's chordCashAI technology provides an automated advance experience for independent musicians while enabling clients to choose their own terms and retain ownership of their music.

References

External links
Official website

Mass media companies established in 2006
Digital audio distributors
Record label distributors
2006 establishments in Florida